Giovanni Battista Costa (1833–1893), also called Giovanni Costa, was an Italian genre painter.

Life 
Giovanni Battista Costa was born in Livorno on 12 May 1833. He was a student at the Accademia di Belle Arti di Firenze and worked afterwards in Florence, where he died on 6 December 1893. He painted genre scenes and historical costume pictures, especially scenes from ancient Rome and the Orient.

Gallery

References

Sources 

 Bénézit, Emmanuel (1924). «Costa (Giovanni)». In Dictionnaire critique et documentaire des peintres, sculpteurs, dessinateurs & graveurs de tous les temps et de tous les pays. Vol. 1. Paris: Ernest Gründ. p. 1019.
 Chiusa, Maria Cristina (2003). "Costa family". Grove Art Online. Oxford Art Online. Retrieved 7 October 2022.
 Stolzenburg, Andreas (2021). "Costa, Giovanni Battista (1833)". In Beyer, Andreas; Savoy, Bénédicte; Tegethoff, Wolf (eds.). Allgemeines Künstlerlexikon - Internationale Künstlerdatenbank - Online. K. G. Saur. Retrieved 7 October 2022.
 "Costa, Giovanni". Benezit Dictionary of Artists. 2011. Oxford Art Online. Retrieved 7 October 2022.

1833 births
1893 deaths
19th-century Italian painters
Orientalist painters